Clifton T. Parks (April 8, 1895 – August 26, 1976) was an American lawyer and attorney.

Parks was born in Minnesota and lived in Saint Paul, Minnesota with his wife. He was a lawyer. Parks served in the Minnesota House of Representatives from 1953 to 1962 and in the Minnesota Senate from 1963 to 1970. Parks died from a heart ailment at Bethesda Hospital in Sant Paul, Minnesota.\

References

1895 births
1976 deaths
Politicians from Saint Paul, Minnesota
Minnesota lawyers
Members of the Minnesota House of Representatives
Minnesota state senators